Ancylomarina subtilis is a Gram-negative, facultatively anaerobic, moderately halophilic and non-motile bacterium from the genus of Ancylomarina, which has been isolated from sediments from the coast of Weihai in China.

References

External links
Type strain of Ancylomarina subtilis at BacDive -  the Bacterial Diversity Metadatabase

Bacteria described in 2016
Bacteroidia